The year 1991 in film involved some significant events. Important films released this year included The Silence of the Lambs, Beauty and the Beast, Thelma & Louise, JFK and Terminator 2: Judgment Day.

Highest-grossing films

The top 10 films released in 1991 by worldwide gross are as follows:

Events
February 14 – The Silence of the Lambs is released and becomes only the third film after It Happened One Night (1934) and One Flew Over the Cuckoo's Nest (1975) to win the top five categories at the Academy Awards: Best Picture; Best Director (Jonathan Demme); Best Actor (Anthony Hopkins); Best Actress (Jodie Foster); and Best Adapted Screenplay (Ted Tally). It is also the first, and to date only, Best Picture winner widely considered to be a horror film.
 July 3 – Terminator 2: Judgment Day became one of the landmarks for science fiction action films with its groundbreaking visual effects from Industrial Light & Magic.
August 7 - Sony Pictures Entertainment is formed, acquiring Columbia Pictures Industries. As a result of this new formation, Tri-Star Pictures drops the hyphen from its name and becomes TriStar Pictures, while RCA/Columbia Pictures Home Video becomes Columbia-TriStar Home Video.
October – Mark Canton replaces Frank Price as chairman of Columbia Pictures.
November 22 – Walt Disney Pictures releases Beauty and the Beast, based on the original fairy tale and Jean Cocteau's 1946 film, the film became one of the most prestigious and greatest animated and romantic films in cinema history. It went on to become the first animated film ever nominated for the Academy Award for Best Picture.

Awards 

Academy Awards 	
Golden Globe Awards

Palme d'Or (Cannes Film Festival):
Barton Fink, directed by Joel and Ethan Coen, United States

Golden Lion (Venice Film Festival):
Close to Eden (Urga), directed by Nikita Mikhalkov, France / USSR

Golden Bear (Berlin Film Festival):
La Casa del sorriso (The House of Smiles), directed by Marco Ferreri, Italy

1991 Wide-release films

January–March

April–June

July–September

October–December

Notable films released in 1991
United States unless stated

#
29th Street, starring Danny Aiello and Anthony LaPaglia

A
Across the Tracks, starring Ricky Schroder and Brad Pitt
The Addams Family, directed by Barry Sonnenfeld, starring Raúl Juliá, Anjelica Huston, Christopher Lloyd, Christina Ricci
The Adjuster, directed by Atom Egoyan, starring Elias Koteas – (Canada)
Afraid of the Dark (aka Double Vue), starring James Fox and Fanny Ardant – (UK/France)
All I Want for Christmas, starring Thora Birch and Lauren Bacall
Les Amants du Pont-Neuf (aka The Lovers on the Bridge), starring Juliette Binoche – (France)
Anna Karamazoff, starring Jeanne Moreau – (U.S.S.R.)
An American Tail: Fievel Goes West
Another You, starring Richard Pryor, Gene Wilder, Mercedes Ruehl
And You Thought Your Parents Were Weird
Armour of God II: Operation Condor (Fei ying gai wak), starring Jackie Chan – (Hong Kong)
The Assassin of the Tsar (Tsareubiytsa) – (U.S.S.R.)
At Play in the Fields of the Lord, starring Tom Berenger, Aidan Quinn, Daryl Hannah, John Lithgow, Tom Waits, Kathy Bates

B
Backdraft, directed by Ron Howard, starring Kurt Russell, William Baldwin, Robert De Niro, Donald Sutherland, Scott Glenn, Jennifer Jason Leigh
The Ballad of the Sad Café, directed by Simon Callow, starring Vanessa Redgrave and Keith Carradine – (UK)
Barton Fink, directed by The Coen brothers, starring John Turturro, John Goodman, Judy Davis, John Mahoney, Michael Lerner – Palme d'Or award
Beauty and the Beast
La Belle Noiseuse (The Beautiful Troublemaker), directed by Jacques Rivette, starring Michel Piccoli, Jane Birkin and Emmanuelle Béart – (France)
Bill & Ted's Bogus Journey, starring Keanu Reeves and Alex Winter
Billy Bathgate, directed by Robert Benton, starring Dustin Hoffman, Nicole Kidman, Loren Dean, Steven Hill, Bruce Willis
Bingo, starring Cindy Williams
Black Robe, directed by Bruce Beresford – (Canada/Australia)
Blue Desert, starring Courteney Cox
Body Parts, starring Jeff Fahey and Kim Delaney
The Borrower, directed by John McNaughton, starring Rae Dawn Chong and Don Gordon
Boyz n the Hood, directed by John Singleton, starring Cuba Gooding Jr., Ice Cube, Morris Chestnut, Laurence Fishburne
A Brighter Summer Day (Gu ling jie shao nian sha ren shi jian), directed by Edward Yang – (Taiwan)
Brother Future
Bugsy, directed by Barry Levinson, starring Warren Beatty, Annette Bening, Harvey Keitel, Ben Kingsley, Joe Mantegna – Golden Globe Award for Best Picture (Drama)
The Butcher's Wife, starring Demi Moore and Jeff Daniels
By the Sword, starring Eric Roberts and F. Murray Abraham

C
Cabeza de Vaca – (Mexico)
Cape Fear, directed by Martin Scorsese, starring Robert De Niro, Nick Nolte, Jessica Lange, Juliette Lewis, Illeana Douglas, Joe Don Baker
Cast a Deadly Spell, directed by Martin Campbell, starring Fred Ward, Julianne Moore, David Warner, Clancy Brown
Chains of Gold, starring John Travolta, Héctor Elizondo, Benjamin Bratt
Child's Play 3, directed by Jack Bender, starring Justin Whalin
City of Hope, directed by John Sayles, starring Chris Cooper, Joe Morton, Vincent Spano, Angela Bassett
City Slickers, directed by Ron Underwood, starring Billy Crystal, Daniel Stern, Bruno Kirby, Helen Slater, Jack Palance
Class Action, directed by Michael Apted, starring Gene Hackman and Mary Elizabeth Mastrantonio
Close My Eyes, starring Alan Rickman and Clive Owen – (UK)
Close to Eden (Urga) – (U.S.S.R.)
Closet Land, starring Madeleine Stowe and Alan Rickman
Cold Heaven, starring Theresa Russell and Mark Harmon
Cold Moon (Lune Froide) – (France)
The Commitments, directed by Alan Parker, starring Robert Arkins, Colm Meaney, Andrew Strong – (Ireland/US/UK)
Company Business, starring Gene Hackman and Mikhail Baryshnikov
Confesión a Laura (Confessing to Laura) – (Colombia)
Calls Controlled (Rozmowy kontrolowane) – (Poland)
Cool as Ice, starring Vanilla Ice and Kristin Minter
Crooked Hearts, starring Jennifer Jason Leigh, Peter Berg, Vincent D'Onofrio, Juliette Lewis, Peter Coyote, Noah Wyle and Cindy Pickett
Cup Final (גמר גביע, gmar gavi'a) – (Israel)
Curly Sue, starring James Belushi, Kelly Lynch and Alisan Porter

D
The Dark Backward, starring Judd Nelson, James Caan, Wayne Newton
The Dark Wind, starring Lou Diamond Phillips, Fred Ward
Dead Again, directed by and starring Kenneth Branagh, with Emma Thompson, Andy García, Robin Williams
Deceived, starring Goldie Hawn and John Heard
December Bride, starring Saskia Reeves, Donal McCann, Ciarán Hinds – (Ireland)
Defending Your Life, directed by and starring Albert Brooks, with Meryl Streep, Rip Torn, Lee Grant
Defenseless, starring Barbara Hershey and Sam Shepard
Delicatessen, directed by Marc Caro and Jean-Pierre Jeunet – (France)
Delirious, starring John Candy and Mariel Hemingway
Dingo, starring Colin Friels – (Australia)
Doc Hollywood, starring Michael J. Fox, Julie Warner, Woody Harrelson, Bridget Fonda
The Doctor, starring William Hurt, Christine Lahti, Mandy Patinkin, Adam Arkin, Elizabeth Perkins
Dogfight, starring River Phoenix
Don't Tell Mom the Babysitter's Dead, starring Christina Applegate
The Doors, directed by Oliver Stone, starring Val Kilmer, Meg Ryan, Kyle MacLachlan, Frank Whaley, Kathleen Quinlan
Double Impact, starring Jean-Claude Van Damme
The Double Life of Véronique (La double vie de Véronique) or (Podwójne życie Weroniki) – (France/Poland)
Drop Dead Fred, starring Phoebe Cates and Rik Mayall
Dutch, starring Ed O'Neill and Ethan Embry
Dying Young, starring Julia Roberts and Campbell Scott

E
Edge of Honor, starring Corey Feldman
Edward II, directed by Derek Jarman – (UK)
The Elementary School (Obecná škola) – (Czechoslovakia)
Ernest Scared Stupid, starring Jim Varney and Eartha Kitt
Europa, directed by Lars von Trier – (Denmark/Germany/Sweden)
Eve Of Destruction, starring Gregory Hines and Renée Soutendijk
Eyes of an Angel, starring John Travolta

F
F/X2, starring Bryan Brown and Brian Dennehy
Father of the Bride, directed by Charles Shyer, starring Steve Martin, Diane Keaton, Martin Short, Kimberly Williams, George Newbern
Fight Back to School (Tao xue wei long), directed by Gordon Chan – (Hong Kong)
Final Approach, starring Héctor Elizondo
Fire! (Ta Dona) – (Mali)
The Fisher King, directed by Terry Gilliam, starring Robin Williams, Jeff Bridges, Mercedes Ruehl, Amanda Plummer
The Five Heartbeats, directed by Robert Townsend, starring Robert Townsend, Michael Wright, Leon Robinson
Flight of the Intruder, starring Danny Glover and Willem Dafoe
Flirting, starring Noah Taylor, Thandie Newton and Nicole Kidman – (Australia)
For the Boys, directed by Mark Rydell, starring Bette Midler, James Caan, Arye Gross, Arliss Howard, George Segal
Frankie and Johnny, directed by Garry Marshall, starring Al Pacino, Michelle Pfeiffer, Kate Nelligan, Héctor Elizondo
Freddy's Dead: The Final Nightmare
Fried Green Tomatoes, directed by Jon Avnet, starring Kathy Bates, Jessica Tandy, Mary Stuart Masterson, Mary-Louise Parker
The Frontier (La Frontera) – (Chile)
Fast Getaway

G
Godzilla vs. King Ghidorah (Gojira tai Kingu Gidora) – (Japan)
Going Under 
Grand Canyon, directed by Lawrence Kasdan, starring Danny Glover, Steve Martin, Alfre Woodard, Kevin Kline
The Grass Arena, starring Mark Rylance and Pete Postlethwaite – (UK)
Guilty by Suspicion, directed by Irwin Winkler, starring Robert De Niro, Annette Bening, Patricia Wettig, George Wendt

H
Happy Days (Schastlivye dni) – (U.S.S.R.)
Hard Promises, starring Sissy Spacek and William Petersen
The Hard Way, directed by John Badham, starring Michael J. Fox and James Woods
Harley Davidson and the Marlboro Man, starring Mickey Rourke and Don Johnson
Hear My Song, starring Adrian Dunbar, David McCallum, Ned Beatty – (UK)
He Said, She Said, starring Kevin Bacon and Elizabeth Perkins
High Heels (Tacones lejanos), directed by Pedro Almodóvar, starring Marisa Paredes – (Spain)
Highlander II: The Quickening, starring Christopher Lambert, Sean Connery, Virginia Madsen and Michael Ironside
Highway 61 – (Canada)
The Hitman, starring Chuck Norris
Hook, directed by Steven Spielberg, starring Robin Williams, Dustin Hoffman, Julia Roberts, Bob Hoskins
Hot Shots!, directed by Jim Abrahams, starring Charlie Sheen, Cary Elwes, Valeria Golino, Lloyd Bridges
The Hours and Times
The House of Smiles (La casa del sorriso), starring Ingrid Thulin – (Italy)
Hudson Hawk, starring Bruce Willis, Danny Aiello, Andie MacDowell, Sandra Bernhard, Richard E. Grant, James Coburn
Hum (Us) – (India)

I
I Don't Kiss (J'embrasse pas), directed by André Téchiné, starring Manuel Blanc, Philippe Noiret, Emmanuelle Béart – (France)
If Looks Could Kill, starring Richard Grieco
Impromptu, starring Judy Davis and Hugh Grant – (UK/France)
The Indian Runner, directed by Sean Penn, starring Viggo Mortensen and David Morse
The Inner Circle, directed by Andrei Konchalovsky – (United States/Italy/U.S.S.R.)

J
JFK, directed by Oliver Stone, starring Kevin Costner, Tommy Lee Jones, Gary Oldman, Joe Pesci, Laurie Metcalf, Sissy Spacek, Kevin Bacon, John Candy
Jacquot de Nantes, directed by Agnès Varda – (France)
Johnny Stecchino, directed by and starring Roberto Benigni – (Italy)
Johnny Suede, starring Brad Pitt
Jungle Fever, directed by Spike Lee, starring Wesley Snipes, Annabella Sciorra and John Turturro

K
K2, directed by Franc Roddam – (UK/Japan/US)
Kafka, directed by Steven Soderbergh, starring Jeremy Irons, Theresa Russell, Ian Holm
King Ralph, starring John Goodman and Peter O'Toole
A Kiss Before Dying, starring Matt Dillon and Sean Young

L
L.A. Story, directed by Mick Jackson, starring Steve Martin, Victoria Tennant, Richard E. Grant, Marilu Henner, Sarah Jessica Parker
Lamhe (Moments), starring Anil Kapoor and Sridevi – (India)
The Last Boy Scout, directed by Tony Scott, starring Bruce Willis and Damon Wayans
Late for Dinner, starring Brian Wimmer, Peter Berg, Marcia Gay Harden and Peter Gallagher
Lee Rock (Wu yi tan zhang), starring Jackie Chan, Sammo Hung and Andy Lau – (Hong Kong)
Let Him Have It, starring Christopher Eccleston – (UK)
Life, and Nothing More... (Zendegi va digar hich), directed by Abbas Kiarostami – (Iran)
Life is Sweet, directed by Mike Leigh, starring Jim Broadbent and Jane Horrocks – (UK)
Life on a String (Bian zou bian chang), directed by Chen Kaige – (China)
Life Stinks, directed by and starring Mel Brooks, with Lesley Ann Warren, Jeffrey Tambor, Howard Morris
The Linguini Incident, starring Rosanna Arquette and David Bowie
The Little Engine That Could
Little Man Tate, directed by and starring Jodie Foster, with Dianne Wiest, Harry Connick Jr., Adam Hann-Byrd
Love Hurts, directed by Bud Yorkin, starring Jeff Daniels, John Mahoney, Judith Ivey
Love in the Time of Hysteria (Sólo Con Tu Pareja) – (Mexico)
Lovers (Amantes) – (Spain)

M
Madonna: Truth or Dare, a documentary on Madonna
Madame Bovary, directed by Claude Chabrol, starring Isabelle Huppert – (France)
The Man in the Moon, starring Reese Witherspoon, Jason London, Sam Waterston, Tess Harper
Mannequin Two: On the Move
The Marrying Man, starring Alec Baldwin, Kim Basinger, Elisabeth Shue, Robert Loggia, Fisher Stevens, Paul Reiser
Mayrig, directed by Henri Verneuil, starring Richard Berry, Claudia Cardinale, Omar Sharif – (France)
McBain, starring Christopher Walken
Mediterraneo – (Italy)
Meet the Applegates, starring Ed Begley Jr. and Stockard Channing
The Miracle, directed by Neil Jordan, starring Beverly D'Angelo
Mississippi Masala, directed by Mira Nair, starring Denzel Washington
Mobsters, starring Christian Slater, Patrick Dempsey, Richard Grieco, Costas Mandylor
Mortal Thoughts, starring Demi Moore, Glenne Headly, Bruce Willis, John Pankow, Harvey Keitel
My Best Friend, General Vasili, Son of Joseph Stalin (Moy luchshiy drug, general Vasiliy, syn Iosifa) – (U.S.S.R.)
My Girl, starring Anna Chlumsky, Macaulay Culkin, Dan Aykroyd, Jamie Lee Curtis
My Heroes Have Always Been Cowboys, starring Scott Glenn, Kate Capshaw, Ben Johnson, Gary Busey, Tess Harper, Balthazar Getty, Mickey Rooney
My Own Private Idaho, directed by Gus Van Sant, starring River Phoenix and Keanu Reeves
My Sons (musuko) – Japan Academy Prize for Picture of the Year – (Japan)
Mystery Date, starring Ethan Hawke – (United States/Canada)

N
The Naked Gun 2½: The Smell of Fear, directed by David Zucker, starring Leslie Nielsen, Priscilla Presley, George Kennedy, Robert Goulet
Naked Lunch, directed by David Cronenberg, starring Peter Weller and Judy Davis – (Canada/UK/Japan)
Necessary Roughness, starring Scott Bakula, Héctor Elizondo, Harley Jane Kozak, Kathy Ireland
New Jack City, starring Wesley Snipes, Ice-T, Mario Van Peebles, Judd Nelson
Night on Earth, starring Gena Rowlands and Winona Ryder
Njan Gandharvan (I, Celestial Lover) – (India)
Not Without My Daughter, starring Sally Field and Alfred Molina
Nothing but Trouble, starring Chevy Chase, Demi Moore, Dan Aykroyd, John Candy

O
The Object of Beauty, starring John Malkovich and Andie MacDowell
Once A Thief (Zong heng si hai), directed by John Woo, starring Chow Yun-fat and Leslie Cheung – (Hong Kong)
Once Around, starring Holly Hunter, Richard Dreyfuss, Danny Aiello, Gena Rowlands
Once Upon a Time in China (Wong Fei Hung), starring Jet Li – (Hong Kong)
One Good Cop, starring Michael Keaton and Rene Russo
Only The Lonely, directed by Chris Columbus, starring John Candy, Ally Sheedy, Maureen O'Hara, James Belushi, Anthony Quinn
Oscar, directed by John Landis, starring Sylvester Stallone, Marisa Tomei, Vincent Spano, Peter Riegert, Linda Gray, Tim Curry
Other People's Money, directed by Norman Jewison, starring Danny DeVito, Gregory Peck, Piper Laurie, Penelope Ann Miller, Dean Jones
Out for Justice, starring Steven Seagal
Out of Life (Hors la vie), directed by Maroun Bagdadi, starring Hippolyte Girardot – (France)
The Ox (Oxen), directed by Sven Nykvist, starring Stellan Skarsgård – (Sweden)

P
Pappa Ante Portas – (Germany)
Paradise, starring Melanie Griffith and Don Johnson
Paris Trout, starring Dennis Hopper, Barbara Hershey and Ed Harris
Pastime, starring William Russ, Glenn Plummer, Jeffrey Tambor
Paths of Death and Angels (Halálutak és angyalok) – (Hungary)
The People Under the Stairs, directed by Wes Craven, starring Brandon Adams and Ving Rhames
The Perfect Weapon, starring Jeff Speakman
Point Break, directed by Kathryn Bigelow, starring Patrick Swayze, Keanu Reeves and Gary Busey
Poison
Popcorn, directed by Mark Herrier, starring Jill Schoelen, Tom Villard, Tony Roberts, Dee Wallace
The Prince of Tides, directed by and starring Barbra Streisand, with Nick Nolte, Blythe Danner, Melinda Dillon, Jason Gould, George Carlin
Proof, starring Hugo Weaving and Russell Crowe – (Australia)
Prospero's Books, directed by Peter Greenaway, starring John Gielgud – (UK/France)
Pure Luck, starring Danny Glover and Martin Short

Q
Queens Logic, starring Kevin Bacon, Joe Mantegna, John Malkovich, Jamie Lee Curtis, Linda Fiorentino, Chloe Webb
Quiet Days in August (Isyhes meres tou Avgoustou) – (Greece)

R
A Rage in Harlem, directed by Bill Duke, starring Forest Whitaker, Gregory Hines, Robin Givens
Raise the Red Lantern (Dà Hóng Dēnglóng Gāogāo Guà), directed by Zhang Yimou, starring Gong Li – (China/Hong Kong/Taiwan)
Rambling Rose, directed by Martha Coolidge, starring Laura Dern, Robert Duvall, Diane Ladd, Lukas Haas
The Rapture, directed by Michael Tolkin, starring Mimi Rogers, David Duchovny, Will Patton
Regarding Henry, directed by Mike Nichols, starring Harrison Ford and Annette Bening
Requiem pro panenku (Requiem for a Maiden) – (Czechoslovakia)
Return to the Blue Lagoon, starring Milla Jovovich and Brian Krause
Rhapsody in August (Hachigatsu no rapusodī), directed by Akira Kurosawa, starring Richard Gere – (Japan)
Ricochet, starring Denzel Washington, John Lithgow, Lindsay Wagner, Ice-T
Riki-Oh: The Story of Ricky (Lik Wong) – (Hong Kong)
Robin Hood: Prince of Thieves, starring Kevin Costner, Morgan Freeman, Mary Elizabeth Mastrantonio, Alan Rickman, Christian Slater
The Rocketeer, starring Billy Campbell, Jennifer Connelly, Timothy Dalton, Alan Arkin, Paul Sorvino
Rover Dangerfield, an animated film starring Rodney Dangerfield
Run, starring Patrick Dempsey
Rush, starring Jason Patric and Jennifer Jason Leigh

S
Saajan, starring Sanjay Dutt and Salman Khan – (India)
Sadak, starring Sanjay Dutt and Pooja Bhatt – (India)
Scanners II: The New Order
A Scene at the Sea (Ano natsu, ichiban shizukana umi), directed by Takeshi Kitano – (Japan)
Scenes from a Mall, directed by Paul Mazursky, starring Woody Allen and Bette Midler
Scorchers, starring Faye Dunaway and James Earl Jones
The Search for Signs of Intelligent Life in the Universe, starring Lily Tomlin
Sebastian Star Bear: First Mission (Beertje Sebastiaan: De Geheime Opdracht) – (Netherlands)
Shadows and Fog, directed by and starring Woody Allen with Mia Farrow, John Malkovich, John Cusack, Madonna
Shattered, directed by Wolfgang Petersen, starring Tom Berenger, Greta Scacchi, Bob Hoskins
Showdown in Little Tokyo, starring Dolph Lundgren and Brandon Lee
The Silence of the Lambs, directed by Jonathan Demme, starring Jodie Foster, Anthony Hopkins, Scott Glenn, Ted Levine, Anthony Heald, Diane Baker
Silver Stallion (Eunma neun oji anhneunda) – (South Korea)
Slacker, directed by and starring Richard Linklater
Sleeping with the Enemy starring Julia Roberts, Patrick Bergin, Kevin Anderson
Soapdish, directed by Michael Hoffman, starring Sally Field, Kevin Kline, Robert Downey Jr., Elisabeth Shue, Whoopi Goldberg
Star Trek VI: The Undiscovered Country, starring William Shatner, Leonard Nimoy, Christopher Plummer, Kim Cattrall, Brock Peters, Iman
Stepping Out, starring Liza Minnelli, Julie Walters, Jane Krakowski, Andrea Martin, Bill Irwin, Shelley Winters
Stone Cold, starring Brian Bosworth
Strictly Business, starring Tommy Davidson and Halle Berry
Suburban Commando, starring Hulk Hogan, Christopher Lloyd, Shelley Duvall
The Super, starring Joe Pesci
The Suspended Step of the Stork (To meteoro vima tou pelargou), starring Marcello Mastroianni and Jeanne Moreau – (Greece)
Switch, directed by Blake Edwards, starring Ellen Barkin, Jimmy Smits, Lorraine Bracco
Swordsmen in Double Flag Town (Shuang-Qi-Zhen daoke) – (China)

T
Talent for the Game, starring Edward James Olmos, Lorraine Bracco, Terry Kinney
The Taking of Beverly Hills, starring Ken Wahl and Harley Jane Kozak
Teenage Mutant Ninja Turtles II: The Secret of the Ooze
Terminator 2: Judgment Day, directed by James Cameron, starring Arnold Schwarzenegger, Linda Hamilton, Robert Patrick, Edward Furlong
Thelma & Louise, directed by Ridley Scott, starring Geena Davis, Susan Sarandon, Harvey Keitel, Michael Madsen, Brad Pitt
Together Alone
Toto the Hero (Toto le Héros) – (Belgium)
Tous les Matins du Monde (All the Mornings of the World), starring Jean-Pierre Marielle and Gérard Depardieu – (France)
Towards Evening (Verso sera), starring Marcello Mastroianni and Sandrine Bonnaire – (Italy)
Toy Soldiers, starring Sean Astin, Wil Wheaton, Louis Gossett Jr., Denholm Elliott
Tricky Brains (Jing gu jyun ga), starring Andy Lau – (Hong Kong)
True Colors, starring John Cusack and James Spader

U
Ultra, directed by Ricky Tognazzi – (Italy)
Under Suspicion, starring Liam Neeson and Laura San Giacomo
Until the End of the World (Bis ans Ende der Welt), directed by Wim Wenders, starring William Hurt, Solveig Dommartin, Sam Neill – (Germany/France/Australia)

V
Van Gogh, directed by Maurice Pialat – (France)
Victim of Love, starring Pierce Brosnan, Virginia Madsen, JoBeth Williams
V. I. Warshawski, starring Kathleen Turner
Voyager, starring Sam Shepard and Julie Delpy – (Germany)

W
What About Bob?, directed by Frank Oz, starring Bill Murray, Richard Dreyfuss, Julie Hagerty, Charlie Korsmo, Kathryn Erbe
Where Angels Fear to Tread, starring Helena Bonham Carter, Rupert Graves, Judy Davis – (UK)
White Fang, starring Ethan Hawke and Klaus Maria Brandauer
Whore, starring Theresa Russell
Wicked Game, directed by Henry Barakat, starring Salah Zulfikar – (Egypt)
Wild Hearts Can't Be Broken, starring Gabrielle Anwar
Woman of the Port (La mujer del puerto) – (Mexico)
A Woman's Tale – (Australia)

Y
Year of the Gun, directed by John Frankenheimer, starring Andrew McCarthy, Valeria Golino, Sharon Stone
The Yes Man (Il Portaborse) – (Italy)
Yumeji, directed by Seijun Suzuki – (Japan)

Births
 January 2 - Ben Hardy (actor), English actor
 January 4 - Charles Melton (actor), American actor and model
 January 13 - Genevieve Gaunt, English actress
 January 15
Ayeza Khan, Pakistani actress and model
Lulu Popplewell, English comedian and actress
 January 17 – Willa Fitzgerald, American actress
 January 18 – Britt McKillip, Canadian actress, singer
 January 19 – Erin Sanders, American actress
 January 21
Craig Roberts, Welsh actor and director
Brittany Tiplady, Canadian actress
 January 25
Ariana DeBose, American actress, dancer and singer
Rupert Simonian, British actor
 January 27 - Cristo Fernández, Mexican actor
 January 28 – Calum Worthy, Canadian actor, musician
 February 10 – Emma Roberts, American actress
 February 12 - Tanaya Beatty, Canadian actress
 February 17
Ed Sheeran, English singer-songwriter
Bonnie Wright, English actress
 February 18 – Malese Jow, American actress
 February 21 - Joe Alwyn, English actor
 February 24 - O'Shea Jackson Jr., American actor and rapper
 February 25 – Tony Oller, American singer, songwriter and actor
 February 28 – Sarah Bolger, Irish actress
 March 2 - Jake Picking, German-born American actor
 March 5 - Hanna Mangan-Lawrence, English-Australian actress
 March 6 – Tyler, The Creator, American rapper
 March 8 – Devon Werkheiser, American actor
 March 9 – Domo Genesis, American rapper
 March 17 – Kristjan Lüüs, Estonian actor 
 March 19 – Garrett Clayton, American actor
 March 23 - Madelyn Deutch, American actress, director, musician and writer
 March 25 – Seychelle Gabriel, American actress
 March 28 – Amy Bruckner, American actress
 March 29
Irene (singer), South Korean singer, rapper and actress
Samantha Win, Canadian actress
 March 31 - Elliot Barnes-Worrell, English actor
 April 4
Jamie Lynn Spears, American actress
Jamie Loy, American actress
 April 9 – Amber Lee Connors, American voice actress
 April 10
 AJ Michalka, American singer and actress
 Sergiusz Żymełka, Polish actor
 April 13 - Dylan Penn, American actress and model
 April 21 - Frank Dillane, English actor
 May 6 - Shamier Anderson, Canadian actor
 May 17 - Daniel Curtis Lee, American actor, comedian and rapper
 May 21 – Sarah Ramos, American actress
 June 1 – Zazie Beetz, American actress
 June 7 - Emily Ratajkowski, English-born American actress and model
 June 11 – Kärt Tammjärv, Estonian actress 
 June 15 - Lindsay Seidel, American voice actress
 June 18 – Willa Holland, American actress
 June 24 - Dexter Darden, American actor
 June 26 - Will Attenborough, British actor
 June 29 
Tajja Isen, Canadian actress and singer-songwriter
Addison Timlin, American actress
 July 5 – Jason Dolley, American actor
 July 6 – Victoire Thivisol, French actress
 July 7 - Eve Hewson, Irish actress
 July 8 - Thuso Mbedu, South African actress
 July 9 – Mitchel Musso, American actor
 July 12 – Erik Per Sullivan, American actor
 July 16 – Alexandra Shipp, American actress
 July 29 - Jahmil French, Canadian actor (died 2021)
 August 12 – Lakeith Stanfield, American actor
 August 13 - Nikita Hopkins, American screenwriter, visual artist and former child voice actor
 August 16 – Evanna Lynch, Irish actress
 August 17 – Austin Butler, American actor
 August 22 – Naomi Ackie, English actress
 August 23 - Jake Manley, Canadian actor
 August 26 – Dylan O'Brien, American actor
 August 28 – Kyle Massey, American actor
 September 4 - Carter Jenkins, American actor
 September 5 – Skandar Keynes, English actor
 September 9
Yang Yang, Chinese actor
Kelsey Chow, American actress
 September 17 - Mena Massoud, Egyptian-born Canadian actor and singer
 September 19 - Tyler Neitzel, American actor
 September 20 – Spencer Locke, American actress
 September 25 - Alix Bénézech, French actress
 September 27 – Thomas Mann, American actress
 October 5 – Xiao Zhan, Chinese actor
 October 6 – Roshon Fegan, American actor, dancer, and rapper
 October 18
Tyler Posey, American actor and musician
Toby Regbo, English actor
 October 19 - Samantha Robinson (American actress), American actress
 October 23 
 Hunter Clowdus, American actor
 Sophie Oda, American actress
 October 27 – Bryan Craig, American actor
 October 28 – Mart Müürisepp, Estonian actor
 October 31 – Jordan-Claire Green, American actress
 November 1 - Anthony Ramos (actor), American actor and singer-songwriter
 November 4 - Tanya Reynolds, English actress
 November 8 – Riker Lynch, American actor, singer, musician
 November 11
Christa B. Allen, American actress
Travis Tope, American actor
 November 13 
Matt Bennett, American actor
Devon Bostick, Canadian actor
 November 15 – Shailene Woodley, American actress
 December 12 – Jaime Lorente, Spanish actor
 December 15 - Eunice Cho, American actress
 December 19 - Keiynan Lonsdale, Australian actor, dancer and singer-songwriter
 December 20
Jillian Rose Reed, American actress
Colin Woodell, American actor
 December 24 - Sofia Black-D'Elia, American actress

Deaths

Film debuts 
Bruce Altman – Regarding Henry
Pamela Anderson – The Taking of Beverly Hills
Tom Arnold – Freddy's Dead: The Final Nightmare
Monica Bellucci – La Riffa
Halle Berry – Jungle Fever
W. Earl Brown – Backdraft
Steve Carell – Curly Sue
James Caviezel – My Own Private Idaho
Morris Chestnut – Boyz n the Hood
Clifton Collins Jr. – Grand Canyon
Ice Cube – Boyz n the Hood
Tommy Davidson – Strictly Business
Leonardo DiCaprio – Critters 3
Wayne Duvall – Final Approach
Christopher Eccleston – Let Him Have It
Brendan Fraser – Dogfight
Edward Furlong – Terminator 2: Judgment Day
James Gandolfini – The Last Boy Scout
Janeane Garofalo – Late for Dinner
Paul Giamatti – Past Midnight
Eddie Griffin – The Five Heartbeats
Jake Gyllenhaal – City Slickers
Philip Seymour Hoffman – Triple Bogey on a Par Five Hole
Joshua Jackson – Crooked Hearts
Regina King – Boyz n the Hood
Queen Latifah – Jungle Fever
Denis Leary – Strictly Business
Téa Leoni – Switch
Matthew Lillard – Ghoulies III: Ghoulies Go to College
Donal Logue – Robotrix
Leslie Mann – Virgin High
Breckin Meyer – Freddy's Dead: The Final Nightmare
Jeffrey Dean Morgan – Uncaged
Elisabeth Moss – Suburban Commando
Kathy Najimy – The Hard Way
Thandie Newton – Flirting
Sophie Okonedo – Young Soul Rebels
Gwyneth Paltrow – Shout
Teri Polo – Born to Ride
John Prosky – Late for Dinner
Richard Roxburgh – Dead to the World
Til Schweiger – Manta, Manta
David Schwimmer – Flight of the Intruder
Rufus Sewell – Twenty-One
Marley Shelton – Grand Canyon
Jeremy Sisto – Grand Canyon
Maura Tierney – Dead Women in Lingerie
Daniel von Bargen – The Silence of the Lambs
Isaiah Washington – The Color of Love
Reese Witherspoon – The Man in the Moon

References

 
Film by year